Piedra is an unincorporated community and a census-designated place (CDP) located in and governed by Hinsdale County, Colorado, United States. The population of the Piedra CDP was 31 at the United States Census 2020. The Pagosa Springs post office (Zip Code 81147) serves the area.

History
The Piedra Post Office was established in 1879, and remained in operation until 1927. Piedra is a name derived from Spanish meaning "stone".

Geography
The Piedra CDP occupies the southeast corner of Hinsdale County in the valley of the Piedra River within San Juan National Forest. It is at the southern edge of the San Juan Mountains.

Demographics

Education
Archuleta County School District 50-JT operates public schools. Pagosa Springs High School is the comprehensive high school.

See also

Outline of Colorado
Index of Colorado-related articles
State of Colorado
Colorado cities and towns
Colorado census designated places
Colorado counties
Hinsdale County, Colorado

References

External links

Piedra @ uncovercolorado.com
Hinsdale County website

Census-designated places in Hinsdale County, Colorado
Census-designated places in Colorado